An indirect presidential election (officially the 10th Federal Convention) was held in Germany on 23 May 1994. Incumbent president Richard von Weizsäcker was term-limited and could therefore not stand for reelection. Roman Herzog, candidate for the Christian Democratic Union, was elected in three rounds of voting.

Composition of the Federal Convention
The President is elected by the Federal Convention consisting of all the members of the Bundestag and an equal number of delegates representing the states. These are divided proportionally by population to each state, and each state's delegation is divided among the political parties represented in its parliament so as to reflect the partisan proportions in the parliament.

Source: Eine Dokumentation aus Anlass der Wahl des Bundespräsidenten am 18. März 2012

Results

References

1994 elections in Germany
1994
May 1994 events in Europe
Roman Herzog
Johannes Rau